The Gabaldon School Buildings or simply known as the Gabaldons is a term used to refer to heritage school buildings in the Philippines built during the American colonial era. They are noted for the architecture inspired from the bahay kubo and bahay na bato.

Background
The Gabaldon School Buildings, also referred to as the Gabaldons, originated from Act No. 1801 or the Gabaldon Law, a legislation written by Isauro Gabaldón of the Philippine Assembly in 1907.

General architecture
The Gabaldons were built by the American colonial government with American architect, William E. Parsons as the designer of the blueprints of said buildings.

According to historians, the buildings are modern in design while drawing elements from the bahay kubo and bahay na bato common in most towns at that time. The Gabaldons are raised  on a platform made of wood or concrete. The buildings also exhibits large windows and high ceilings for ventilation and lighting purposes.

Heritage status
The Gabaldons are protected under Philippine law under Republic Act No. 11194 or the Gabaldon School Buildings Conservation Act. Under the law the "modification, alteration, destruction, demolition or relocation" of Gabaldon buildings are illegal. The particular legislation also designates the Gabaldons as cultural properties citing another legislation known as the Republic Act 10066 or the National Cultural Heritage Act of 2009.

The law mandates local government units to adopt measures for the protection and conservation of Gabaldon buildings under their jurisdiction.

References

 
Cultural Properties of the Philippines